Garnet, Wisconsin is an unincorporated community in Fond du Lac County, in the U.S. state of Wisconsin. The community is on the north boundary of the county, just south of Calumet County. It is located at the intersection of County Highway HHH and Town Hall Road just east of Calumet County C, in the town of Calumet.

History
The community was settled in around 1880. It is nicknamed "Cream City."

Images

Notes

Unincorporated communities in Wisconsin
Unincorporated communities in Fond du Lac County, Wisconsin